Vorontsy is a rural locality (a settlement) in Vinogradovsky District, Arkhangelsk Oblast, Russia. The population was 249 as of 2010. There are 4 streets.

Geography 
Vorontsy is located on the Vayenga River, 38 km northeast of Bereznik (the district's administrative centre) by road.

References 

Rural localities in Vinogradovsky District